Jim Chapman may refer to:

 Jim Chapman (congressman) (born 1945), American businessman and politician
 Jim Chapman Lake, a lake in Texas named after the politician
 Jim Chapman (footballer) (born 1965), Scottish footballer
 Jim Chapman (Internet celebrity), YouTuber and blogger
 Jim Chapman (media personality) (born 1949), Canadian radio and TV personality, musician, journalist and author
 Jim Chapman (American football) (born 1935), American football coach
 Jim Chapman (Resident Evil), fictional character

See also 
 James Chapman (disambiguation)